Emma Peeters is a 2018 romantic comedy film written and directed by Nicole Palo. It is an international production between Belgium and Canada, starring Monia Chokri in the title role of Emma. The film had its world premiere at the 75th Venice International Film Festival.

Cast
 Monia Chokri as Emma
 Fabrice Adde as Alex
 Stéphanie Crayencour as Lulu
 Andréa Ferréol as Bernadette
 Anne Sylvain as Maman
 Jean-Henri Compère as Papa
 Thomas Mustin as Bob
 Jean-Noël Delfanne as Serge

Accolades

References

External links
 

2018 films
2018 romantic comedy films
Belgian romantic comedy films
Canadian romantic comedy films
Films about suicide
2010s French-language films
French-language Belgian films
French-language Canadian films
2010s Canadian films